Jesse is an unincorporated community in Wyoming County, West Virginia, United States, along the Laurel Fork.

The community has the name of Jesse Shumate.

References 

Unincorporated communities in West Virginia
Unincorporated communities in Wyoming County, West Virginia